This is list of archives in the United States.

Archives in the United States

National
Library of Congress
National Archives and Records Administration
Civilian Personnel Records Center
Electronic Records Archives
National Personnel Records Center
Military Personnel Records Center
Smithsonian Institution Archives
National Anthropological Archives
Ralph Rinzler Folklife Archives and Collections

State
Alabama Department of Archives and History
California Ethnic and Multicultural Archives
State Library and Archives of Florida
Georgia Archives
Indiana State Library and Historical Bureau
Louisiana State Archive and Research Library
Maryland State Archives
Minnesota Historical Society Archives
New York State Archives
Oregon State Archives
Pennsylvania State Archives
Tennessee State Library and Archives
Texas State Library and Archives
Washington State Digital Archives
West Virginia & Regional History Center
West Virginia State Archives
Wisconsin Historical Society

City 

 City of Boston Archives
 City of Somerville Archives
 New York City Municipal Archives

Others
Academy Film Archive
American Heritage Center
American Radio Archive
Archive for Research in Archetypal Symbolism
Archives of American Art
Archives of the History of American Psychology
Atlanta Housing Archives
Black Archives of Mid-America
California Green Archives
Charles E. Stevens American Atheist Library and Archives
Department of Distinctive Collections at the Massachusetts Institute of Technology
Gulf Coast Archive and Museum of Gay, Lesbian, Bisexual and Transgender History
GLBT Historical Society
Harvard Film Archive
Historic Films Archive
Hoover Institution Library and Archives
Interference Archive
Internet Archive
The Jacob Rader Marcus Center of the American Jewish Archives
Jean-Nickolaus Tretter Collection in Gay, Lesbian, Bisexual and Transgender Studies
Lambda Archives of San Diego
Lesbian Herstory Archives
Mennonite Church USA Archives
Marquette University Special Collections and University Archives
National African American Archives and Museum
National Public Broadcasting Archives
National Security Archive
ONE National Gay & Lesbian Archives
Pullman Library, Illinois Railway Museum
Rhizome ArtBase
Seeley G. Mudd Manuscript Library at Princeton University
Sophia Smith Collection of Women's History at Smith College
South Texas Archives and Special Collections
Southern Historical Collection
Ukrainian Museum-Archives
Walter P. Reuther Library, Archives of Labor and Urban Affairs
Washington Area Performing Arts Video Archive
Washington University Film & Media Archive
Many presidential libraries include archives.
Many large organizations such as universities, corporations, newspapers, and so on maintain archives consisting of the papers and records which have been created during the course of the organization's life.

See also 

 List of archives
 List of museums in the United States
 Culture of the United States

External links 
Directory of state archives

 
United States
Archives
Archives